Alamagan is an island in the Northern Mariana Islands in the Pacific Ocean,  north of Guguan,  north of Saipan, and  south of Pagan. It is currently uninhabited.

History
Alamagan was once settled by the Chamorros, who left behind archaeological evidence including stone columns (called latte stones) and ceramics. From a European perspective, Alamagan was discovered in 1669 by the Spanish missionary Diego Luis de San Vitores, who named it Concepción (Immaculate Conception in Spanish). It is likely that it was previously visited in 1522 by the Spanish sailor Gonzalo de Vigo, a deserter from the Magellan expedition in 1521 and the first European castaway in the history of the Pacific. In 1695, Alamagan's natives were forcibly removed to Saipan, and three years later to Guam.

Following the sale of the Northern Marianas by Spain to the German Empire in 1899, Alamagan was administered as part of German New Guinea. During this time, a private firm, the Pagan Society, owned by a German and a Japanese partner, developed more coconut plantations. However, severe typhoons in September 1905, September 1907 and December 1913 destroyed the plantations and bankrupted the company.

During World War I, Alamagan came under the control of the Empire of Japan and was administered as the South Seas Mandate. Following World War II, it came under the control of the United States and was administered as part of the Trust Territory of the Pacific Islands. Since 1978, it has been part of the Northern Islands Municipality of the Commonwealth of the Northern Mariana Islands.

The island was inhabited, and continued to be used for the production of copra, with the main settlements of Song Song in the south and Patida camp in the northwest. However, by 1962 the population had dropped so much that the elementary school was closed for lack of students. Due to increased volcanic activity, the islanders were evacuated in December 1998 when an eruption was feared. At the 2000 census, only six people were living on Alamagan. In September 2009, Typhoon Choi-wan passed directly over Alamagan, destroying many of the island's trees and forcing the evacuation of the remaining residents to Saipan. As of the 2010 United States Census, the island is uninhabited.

Geography

There are three smaller cones to the north, northwest and south of the main crater. The volcano has not erupted in historical times, but by radiocarbon dating, eruptions occurred in 540 AD and 870 AD, with a potential dating error of around 100 years. These eruptions involved pyroclastic flows and had a VEI of 4. Any claims of historical eruptions are inaccurate, though uncertain eruptions have occurred as late as 1887. Within the main crater and on the western slopes are a number of active fumaroles.

The island has extremely steep slopes on its eastern side which are prone to landslides. The western slope has deep canyons as the result of erosion. Vegetation on the island's west side includes swordgrass (Miscanthus floridulus). The south-east side is a steep slope of bare lava. Coconut palms (Cocos nucifera), grow on the gradual slopes. There are deep valleys with caves, and there are fresh water springs on the northern part of the west coast.

Important Bird Area
The island has been recognised as an Important Bird Area (IBA) by BirdLife International because it supports populations of Micronesian megapodes, white-throated ground doves, Micronesian myzomelas, Saipan reed warblers and Micronesian starlings.

Demographics
As of 1980 the population of Alamagan was 36.

See also
 List of stratovolcanoes

References
 Russell E. Brainard et al.: Coral reef ecosystem monitoring report of the Mariana Archipelago: 2003–2007. (=PIFSC Special Publication, SP-12-01) NOAA Fisheries, Pacific Islands Fisheries Science Center 2012 (Kapitel Alamagan (englisch, PDF, 12,2 MB)).
 Richard B. Moore, Frank A. Trusdell: Geologic map of Alamagan Volcano, northern Mariana Islands. United States Geological Survey 1993 (Download).

External links 

 Pascal Horst Lehne and Christoph Gäbler: Über die Marianen. Lehne-Verlag, Wohldorf in Germany 1972. and Alamagan
Marianas Archipelago Coral Reef Ecosystems Monitoring Program

Notes

Former German colonies
Islands of the Northern Mariana Islands
Active volcanoes
Volcanoes of the Northern Mariana Islands
Stratovolcanoes of the United States
Calderas of Oceania
Uninhabited islands of the Northern Mariana Islands
Important Bird Areas of the Northern Mariana Islands
Holocene stratovolcanoes